Clarence Edward Noble McCartney (September 18, 1879 – February 19, 1957) was a prominent conservative Presbyterian pastor and author.  With J. Gresham Machen, he was one of the main leaders of the conservatives during the Fundamentalist–Modernist Controversy in the Presbyterian Church in the United States of America.

Early life, 1879-1905

Macartney was born in Northwood, Ohio, on September 18, 1879.  His father, John L. McCartney was the pastor of the Reformed Presbyterian Church of North America in Northwood and professor of Natural Science at Geneva College.  His mother, born Catherine Robertson, was the daughter of a wealthy Scottish mill owner.  The two met during a period when John McCartney was preaching on the Isle of Bute – Robertson's father was opposed to the marriage.

Geneva College (and the Macartneys with it) moved to Beaver Falls, Pennsylvania, in 1880.  In 1894, in response to John's respiratory problems, the family moved to Redlands, California, and then to Claremont in 1895 when John took up a post at Pomona College.  In 1896, the family moved again, to Denver, but Clarence stayed behind to finish high school in Claremont before enrolling in the University of Denver in 1897.  At this point, two of Clarence's older brothers, who were pastors in Wisconsin, convinced the family to move to Madison, so Clarence transferred to the University of Wisconsin–Madison.  He majored in English literature and graduated in 1901.  In 1901, he moved to Cambridge, Massachusetts, to pursue graduate work at Harvard, but grew frustrated and spent a year travelling in England, Scotland, and France.  Upon his return he briefly returned to Beaver Falls to visit another brother and worked as a reporter with the Beaver Times.  In 1902, he enrolled in Yale Divinity School, though, still restless, he departed after one class, and transferred to Princeton Theological Seminary, where another brother was enrolled.  It was about this time that Macartney's religious and vocational drift ended; he rejected the liberal values of Wisconsin–Madison and Yale; and threw himself behind the doctrines of Old School Presbyterianism taught at Princeton.  His professors included B. B. Warfield, Francis Patton, Robert Dick Wilson, and, his personal favorite, church historian Frederick Loetscher.

Minister in Paterson, New Jersey, 1905–1914

Upon his graduation in 1905, he opted to seek ordination not in the Reformed Presbyterian Church in which he had been raised, but rather in the larger Presbyterian Church in the United States of America.  In October, the Presbytery of Jersey City ordained Macartney to the pastorate of the First Presbyterian Church of Paterson, New Jersey, a struggling downtown congregation, into which Macartney's energy breathed new life.  During this period, Macartney became an outspoken advocate of prohibition.

Minister in Philadelphia, 1914–1927

In 1914, he accepted a call from Arch Street Presbyterian Church in Philadelphia, a second congregation located in a deteriorating neighborhood.  In time, he began broadcasting his sermons on the radio and eventually gained the reputation as Philadelphia's foremost preacher.  Later, he began delivering a weekly lecture on homiletics at Princeton Theological Seminary.

In 1919, Macartney engaged in his first printed exchange with Harry Emerson Fosdick.  In a piece entitled "The Trenches and the Church at Home", Fosdick argued that soldiers returning home from World War I would not be able to accept the traditional doctrines and mores and that the church needed to adjust its doctrines to the spirit of the age.  In a response in The Presbyterian, Macartney argued that Christian truth was unchanging and could meet any crisis without needing to be changed.

This exchange, however, was merely a preface to their famous exchange in 1922, when Fosdick preached and distributed his famous sermon "Shall the Fundamentalists Win?" and Macartney responded with "Shall Unbelief Win?", thus setting off the Fundamentalist–Modernist Controversy in the PCUSA.  Alarmed by Fosdick's apparent rejection of Christian orthodoxy, Macartney convinced the Presbytery of Philadelphia to ask the General Assembly of the Presbyterian Church in the USA to take action to silence Fosdick.  At the General Assembly of 1923, Macartney found an ally in William Jennings Bryan, whose arguments on the floor of the Assembly were crucial to securing a vote to affirm the denomination's commitment to the so-called "Five Fundamentals" and ordering New York Presbytery to deal with Fosdick.  In the 1924 General Assembly, where the Fosdick case was again raised, Bryan's support was again crucial to Macartney being elected as Moderator.  Macartney's role at this Assembly was crucial in having Fosdick resign his position.  In 1925, Bryan asked Macartney to attend the Scopes Trial with him, but Macartney refused.  In 1926, when the Special Commission appointed to deal with New York Presbytery's ordination of two men who denied the virgin birth recommended a tolerance in the spirit of the Auburn Affirmation, Macartney was the leading voice calling for stricter adherence to the Five Fundamentals.  Macartney's older, more liberal brother Albert spoke against him during this debate.

Minister in Pittsburgh, 1927–1953

In 1927, Macartney took up a new pastorate, at the First Presbyterian Church of Pittsburgh.  This would be his largest congregation, regularly drawing 1200–1600 worshippers on Sunday mornings and about 900 at the Sunday evening service.  He also held a Wednesday evening service, the sermons from which formed the basis of two books he later published: Things Most Surely Believed (1930) and What Jesus Really Taught (1958).  In 1930, he founded the Tuesday Noon Club for Businessmen, an interdenominational group of Pittsburgh businessmen who met Tuesdays at noon for lunch, singing, and a brief inspirational message - eventually, the group had over 2000 members, with a regular attendance of over 800.

In the denominational politics of the following decade, Macartney often advocated a more moderate approach than that favored by J. Gresham Machen.  Although he initially opposed founding Westminster Theological Seminary in 1929 when Princeton Theological Seminary was re-organized by the denomination along semi-modernist lines, he agreed to serve on Westminster's  board.  He opposed Machen's creation of an independent missions board, and, after Machen was censured for setting up this board, Macartney also opposed Machen's Presbyterian Constitutional Covenant Union.  Ultimately Macartney resigned from Westminster's board rather than go along with these developments.

Career after the Fundamentalist–Modernist Controversy

Macartney did not leave the Presbyterian Church in the USA when Machen did in 1936.  Rather, he became president of the League of Faith, a group founded in 1931 to promote fidelity to scriptures and the Westminster Confession within the PCUSA.  Macartney continued to preach his conservative message in sermons which he disseminated in pamphlets and in over forty books.  He was a frequent preacher on college campuses in the following decades and was asked to deliver the Stone Foundation Lectures at Princeton, the Smythe Lectures at Columbia Theological Seminary, and the Payton Lectures at Fuller Theological Seminary.  He opposed the spread of neo-orthodoxy at Princeton Theological Seminary, questioning, for instance, the decision to hire Emil Brunner.  He also mentored over a dozen assistant pastors, including Harold Ockenga, the founder of the National Association of Evangelicals.

He was also a dedicated amateur historian, with an especial interest in the American Civil War.

Death
He died on February 19, 1957, at Geneva College.

Selected Books by Clarence E. Macartney 
12 Great Questions about Christ
A history of the First Presbyterian Church of Paterson, New Jersey
Chariots of fire: And other sermons on Bible characters
Chosen Twelve Plus One
Facing Life and Getting the Best of It
Great Interviews of Jesus
Great Sermons of the World
Highways and Byways of the Civil War
Prayer at the Golden Altar
Putting on Immortality: Reflections on the Life Beyond
Salute Thy Soul: Thirteen Sermons on Biblical Texts
Strange Texts, But Grand Truths
The Bonapartes in America
The Faith Once Delivered: Fifteen Timeless Messages on Basic Christian Beliefs
The Greatest Questions of the Bible and of Life
The Greatest Texts of the Bible
The Greatest Words in the Bible and in Human Speech
The Lamb of God: Previously Unpublished Sermons By Clarence E Macartney
The Making of a Minister: The Autobiography of Clarence E. Macartney
The Minister's Son; A Record of His Achievements
The Parables of the Old Testament
The Prayers of the Old Testament
The Ten Commandments
The Trials of Great Bible Characters
The Wisest Fool and Other Men of the Bible
Trials of Great Men of the Bible
Twelve Great Questions about Christ
What Jesus really taught
Wisest Fool, The
You Can Conquer
Along Life's Highway
Bible Epitaphs.
Chariots of Fire and Other Sermons
Christian Faith and The Spirit of the Age
Grant and His Generals
Grant and His Generals (Essay index reprint series)
Great Characters of the Bible
Great Interviews Of Jesus
Great Nights Of The Bible
Great Sermons of the Word
Great Women of the Bible
He Chose Twelve
Illustrations: Illustrations from the sermons of Clarence Edward Macartney
Lincoln And His Cabinet
Lincoln and his generals
Lincoln and His Generals (Selected Bibliographies Reprint Series)
Lord's Prayer
Macartney's Illustrations. Illustrations from the sermons of Clarence Edward Macartney
Men Who Missed It: Great Americans Who Missed the White House
More sermons from life
Mountains And Mountain Men Of The Bible
Mr. Lincoln's Admirals
Multiple titles: The Greatest Questions of the Bible and of Life, The Woman of Tekoah, Salute Thy Soul
Not Far From Pittsburgh: Places and Personalities of the Land Beyond the Alleghenies
Of Them He Chose Twelve
Paul the Man, His Life, His Message, His Ministry
Peter and His Lord : Twenty-One Sermons on the Life of Peter
Preaching Without Notes
Salute Thy Soul: Thirteen Sermons on Biblical Texts
Sermons from Life
Sermons on Old Testament Heroes
Ten Great Men of the Bible
The Faith Once Delivered: Fifteen Timeless Messages on Basic Christian Beliefs
The greatest Men of the Bible
The Greatest Texts of the Bible - Sermons on the Basic Truths of Scripture
The Greatest Words in the Bible and Human Speech
The Lord's Prayer
The making of a minister : the autobiography of Clarence E. Macartney
The Parables of the Old Testament (Classic Reprint)
The Way of a Man with a Maid (Macartney Bible characters library)
The Wisest Fool and Other Men of the Bible
The Woman of Tekoah and Other Sermons on Bible Characters
Trials of Great Men of the Bible
Twelve Great Questions about Christ
Western Pennsylvania Magazine June 1937 : First Republican convention (Horace Greeley, Andrew Carnegie, etc.), First Shadyside Charcoal, *Pennsylvania Constitutional Convention 1837, Merchants of Pittsburgh 1759 1800
Where the Rivers Meet; Striking Personalities in History of Western Pennsylvania
Woman of Tekoah & Other Sermons on Bible Characters
Wrestlers with God: Prayers of the Old Testament
You can conquer

References

Sources
 Gatiss, L (2008).  Christianity and the Tolerance of Liberalism: J.Gresham Machen and the Presbyterian Controversy of 1922-1937. London, Latimer Trust 
 The Presbyterian Controversy: Fundamentalists, Modernists, and Moderates by Bradley J. Longfield  (1991)
 Crossed Fingers: How the Liberals Captured the Presbyterian Church by Gary North  (1996)

External links 
 McCartney Library. The McCartney Library on the campus of Geneva College houses Macartney's personal documents in its archives.
 "Shall Unbelief Win?" by Clarence E. Macartney  (1922)
 Photo of Macartney
 Papers at the PCA Historical Center

1879 births
1957 deaths
Presbyterian Church in the United States of America ministers
American male writers
Geneva College
Princeton Theological Seminary alumni
University of Denver alumni
University of Wisconsin–Madison College of Letters and Science alumni
Harvard University alumni
American temperance activists
Christian fundamentalists